K.C. George (13 January 1903 – 10 August 1986) was an Indian communist leader from Alleppey, Kerala. He was one of the founding leaders of the Communist Party of India in Travancore. He was the Member of Rajya Sabha during 1952 to 1954 and also served as the Minister for Food and Forests the First E. M. S. Namboodiripad ministry (5 April 1957 to 31 July 1959).

He was the author of Immortal Punnapra-Vayalar and Ente Jeevita Yatra.

He died on 10 August 1986.

References

1903 births
1986 deaths
Communist Party of India politicians from Kerala
Rajya Sabha members from Kerala